Vlastimil Emil Košvanec (December 14, 1887 in Karlín – November 1961 in Prague) was a Czechoslovak painter, graphic designer and illustrator.

Biography

Childhood and youth 
Vlastimil Košvanec son of Bedřich Košvanec, a glover, and Helena Košvancovà, a dressmaker, was born in Karlín on December 14, 1887. He was baptized under the name of Emil Vlastimil in the Roman Catholic church on December 27 of the same year. The family also included brothers Jaromír, Blažen and Bedřich.

After elementary school he attended the Imperial Royal Lyceum and graduated. After high school he enrolled at the Academy of Fine Arts at the Professor Vlaho Bukovac's school. In this period his father died and the industrialist Antonin Pick from Smíchov became his stepfather. Later he studied with Professor Vojtech Hynais, experimenting with techniques of drawing and painting. At the Academy, Košvanec received awards as the best student of the year several times. In 1909 he participated in a contest and received a scholarship by Hlavka foundation, one of the most desirable. The artist moved between many pictorial styles: Realism, Impressionism, Post-Impressionism and Symbolism. During this time he lived in Prague Holešovice district, in Nad Štolou, near the Academy. After academic studies, he traveled abroad until 1939 in Italy, France, Austria, Germany, Netherlands, Albania, Yugoslavia and Montenegro.

Magazines and illustrations 
When he was twenty-eight (in 1916), he was chosen as substitute teacher at the Royal Lyceum of Kolín, 50 km east from Prague. Teaching lasted until the half of the school year 1916/1917. In February 1917 young Košvanec resigned but we don't know the official reasons for this act.

The Czechoslovak Republic was born, on October 28, 1918, after the end of the First World War. The political situation was divided between the Communist Party and the Nationalists. Košvanec began his collaboration with the magazines Koprivy (a satirical publication printed by the Social Democratic Party from 1909 until 1931) and Sršatec (a satirical magazine published by the Communist Party during the Twenties). He probably used at least three pseudonyms to remain anonymous and to protect his safety: V. Havrda, V. Patrik and Karambol.

In 1920, he drew the illustrations of the book Three men with the shark and Other Stories(Tři muži se žralokem a jiné poučné historky) written by Jaroslav Hašek, writer, activist of the Anarchist Party, and author of the famous novel The Good Soldier Švejk (Osudy dobrého vojáka Švejka). A year later, in a booklet called Sovetsk Rusi, illustrations made by Košvanec appeared with those from two Avant-garde artists: Vaclav Spála and Karel Teige. The bohémien painter probably visited Picasso exhibition in 1921 and the 19th and 20th century French art exposition of the 1923.

In 1922, each page of the booklet for children To the children of workers (Dělnickým dětem) was composed of illustrations and two versed notes by Košvanec. The painter was asked to draw two of the four volumes of Les Misérables by Victor Hugo Czech version, and this work became his masterpiece in 1923; the other two volumes were illustrated by graphic artist and painter Václav Cutta. In the same year the artist illustrated the book The fascists of B. G. Sandomirsky; a portrait of Benito Mussolini appeared among the represented images. During the 1920s Košvanec increased its prestige, and in the meantime he married the painter Františka Matouškova, which painted under the pseudonym Sidonie Matoušková-Košvancová later.

The artist, while cooperating with satirical magazines, worked for the left-wing newspaper Právo Lidu, later called Rudé Právo. The caricatures, which accompanied the articles of Antonin Macek, were republished in 1958 in a book titled Kukátka (Binoculars). The Czechoslovak Republic, was a bilingual country until 1945, and the German paper Prager Presse was published there from 1921 to 1938: on its pages Košvanec issued his satirical cartoons. The cover of the book of Ivan Suk Little girls under the lantern (Holčičky pod lucernou, 1926) was illustrated with an impressive drawing, that expresses the light and the shade of the human and social complexity of the prostitutes' world.

Košvanec was an active member of the left-wing group called Umělecká Beseda (founded in 1863) in 1929. It was an intellectual elite which included figurative artists, musicians, philosophers and writers. The group was particularly animated, and it organized events and exhibitions of artists not only in Prague. It promoted international initiatives dedicated to artists like Carlo Carrà (1929), Giorgio de Chirico (1931) and even the École de Paris event of the same year. During this period Košvanec exhibited not only in galleries in Prague, but in the whole Czechoslovakian country.

Portraiture 
Košvanec was considered one of the finest portraitist, appreciated both for his technique and his unique style. He imposed a taste and generated a style, to which the Prague upper classes aspired. The rich bourgeois, the aristocracy, the elite, the businessmen, the intellectual and the illustrious men wanted a portrait to be immortalized. This privileged relation enabled the artist to paint portraits of the most important characters of the First Republic such as the President Edvard Beneš, democratic statesman and politician during the transition period between the end of Habsburg Empire (1918) and the Communist takeover of February 1948.

Košvanec studio was located in Prague XII, in the district of Královsky. In addition to portraits of celebrities, in these years the artist tried out figurative compositions set in bucolic, allegorical, mythical settings, putting emphasis on color, light and joie de vivre. Nature became one thing with female figures, and mythologized women were identified with nymphs or represented as a goddess. After many exhibitions from 1926 to 1937, a highly successful personal exhibition was held in Prague in November 1939. Mr. Oscar Kokoschka, who lived in Prague from 1934 to 1938, played an important role in these events. Košvanec's paintings were more "praguese" at that moment: women appeared elegant, stylish, half-naked, surrounded by a flowering nature over the hills of Petrin, "in the greenish shade of wide gardens and leafy trees" in the quiet Hradcany, and these nymphs revealed the secret charm of Malá Strana and of St. Nicholas Church.

The War 
After the arrival of the Nazi troops in Prague, on March 15, 1939, the German protectorate began to enact a series of anti-Jewish measures. The extermination of Jewish people started then, and Czech Resistance was violently repressed. Košvanec gave his fur coat to German soldiers on the public square, during a fundraising for the German troops in Stalingrad in winter 1942–1943, when the Second World War broke out. This theatrical gesture, which was judged to be outrageous, caused a collaborationism accuse and the immediate expulsion from the Association of Czech artists (Blok ceských výtvarníku) once the war finished.

In 1947, Košvanec was put on trial. The artist was convicted, imprisoned and forced to pay a fine of 40,000 CZK. On September 29, 1949, his wife died, he fell into a deep depression and suffered a total nervous breakdown that forced him to stay in a mental hospital. It seems that he was freed, thanks to the remission of the rest of the sentence, between 1949 and 1950.

Death 
Košvanec painted illegally during the 1950s. The artist fell in love with a young Gypsy woman. He spent his last years in complete isolation until November 1961 when, at the age of 74, died forgotten by everybody and his body was buried in the cemetery of Olšany in Prague.

References

External links 
 Official Website of the Martinengo Villagana Museum, Brescia, Italy

1887 births
1961 deaths
Czechoslovak painters